Roman Valiyev (born 27 March 1984 in Russian SFSR in Orenburg) is a Kazakhstani triple jumper.

He finished fourth at the 2005 Asian Championships and won the silver medal at the 2006 Asian Games. He also competed at the 2004 Olympic Games without reaching the final.

His personal best jump is 16.98 metres, achieved at the 2006 Asian Games in December 2006 in Doha. His new personal best is 17.20 m, achieved in Almaty in 2012, qualifying him for the Olympic Games in London.

Competition record

References 

1984 births
Living people
Kazakhstani male triple jumpers
Olympic athletes of Kazakhstan
Athletes (track and field) at the 2004 Summer Olympics
Athletes (track and field) at the 2008 Summer Olympics
Athletes (track and field) at the 2012 Summer Olympics
Athletes (track and field) at the 2016 Summer Olympics
Asian Games medalists in athletics (track and field)
Athletes (track and field) at the 2006 Asian Games
Athletes (track and field) at the 2010 Asian Games
Athletes (track and field) at the 2014 Asian Games
World Athletics Championships athletes for Kazakhstan
Kazakhstani people of Russian descent
Asian Games silver medalists for Kazakhstan
Olympic male triple jumpers
Medalists at the 2006 Asian Games
20th-century Kazakhstani people
21st-century Kazakhstani people